Akhlak E Hindi is the first Urdu book printed in printing-press in 1803. The book was written by Mir Bahadur Ali Hussaini and deals with ethics.

References

External links
 Online Read on Rekhta

Urdu
Urdu-language books
Ethics books
History of books
1803 non-fiction books
19th-century Indian books